Grace Farms is an 80-acre cultural and humanitarian center in New Canaan, Connecticut. Grace Farms is owned and operated by Grace Farms Foundation, a not-for-profit organization whose interdisciplinary humanitarian mission is to pursue peace through nature, arts, justice, community, faith, and Design for Freedom, a new movement to remove forced labor from the built environment. The Foundation carries out its work through Grace Farms, a SANAA-designed site for convening people across sectors. Its stake in the ground is to end modern slavery and gender-based violence, and create more grace and peace in local and global communities. Sharon Prince is the CEO and Founder of Grace Farms Foundation. Prince also launched the Design for Freedom movement with the publication of a nearly 100-page report that provides analysis and data on forced labor in building materials supply chains. 

Grace Farms Foundation set out to create a building nestled into the existing habitat that would enable visitors to experience nature, encounter the arts, pursue justice, foster community, and explore faith. The River building, designed by the Pritzker Prize-winning, Japanese architecture firm SANAA, is a part of the landscape without drawing attention to itself. Under the continuous roof are five transparent glass-enclosed volumes that can host a variety of activities and events, while maintaining a constant sense of the surrounding environment. The areas of the River building are: the Sanctuary, a 700-seat amphitheater; the library, a staffed library with resources related to Grace Farms Foundation's initiatives; the Commons, a community gathering space with 18-foot-long tables; the Pavilion; a welcome reception and conversation space with tea service; and the Court, a partially below-grade recreational and performance space. Approximately 77 of Grace Farms' 80 acres are currently managed as open meadows, woods, wetlands, and ponds. 

Grace Farms is free and accessible to the public six days a week. It includes two exhibits, open arts studios, and a wide range of daily programming led by its visitor engagement team.  

Permanent contemporary art installations by Thomas Demand, Olafur Eliasson, Teresita Fernández, Beatriz Milhazes, and Susan Philipsz are located around Grace Farms.

Architecture

Opened in 2015, the River building was designed by the Japanese architectural firm SANAA, led by Kazuyo Sejima and Ryue Nishizawa. The porous design of Grace Farms and the River building was meant to inspire and break down barriers between people and nature. Natural light flows through more than 200 floor-to-ceiling glass panels in the River building, generating 360-degree views of the landscape in the changing seasons. The undulating pathways under a curvilinear roof follow the flow and elevation of the land. The River building has been honored nationally and internationally with numerous prestigious design awards. 

Grace Farms consists of the 48-acre former Windsome Farm, an equestrian facility, and an adjacent 27-acre parcel, which were bought between 2008 and 2009 by the Grace Farms Foundation. An additional five acres were later purchased. The property still features the equestrian farm's paddocks, as well as two barns that are now used as a welcome center and offices.

Awards 

 Mies Crown Hall Americas Prize (MCHAP) 2014-2015, Grace Farms
 AIA National 2017 Architecture Honor Award, Grace Farms
 Fast Company, 2016 Innovation by Design Awards, Social Good Finalist, Grace Farms
 The Architect's Newspaper Best of Design Awards, 2016 Building of the Year (East), Grace Farms
 AIA Connecticut 2016 Design Honor Award, Grace Farms
 Illuminating Engineering Society, 2016 Lumen Awards, Award of Merit, BuroHappold for Grace Farms
 2016 Architizer A+Awards, Architecture +Engineering, Grace Farms
 Greater New York Construction User Council, 2016 Chairman's Reception, Public Space, Grace Farms
 Engineering News-Record (ENR) New England, Best Project Winner for Culture/Worship category, August 2016, Grace Farms
 The Ceilings & Interior Systems Construction Association (CISCA), 2015
 Construction Excellence Award in Acoustical Solutions East Region - Gold, Grace Farms
 TownVibe, 2016 Green Award, Grace Farms
 LEED Silver Certification for Operations and Maintenance, 2019

See also
Philip Johnson Glass House

References

External links

Grace Farms - official site
Grace Community Church - official site

Tourist attractions in Fairfield County, Connecticut
Buildings and structures in New Canaan, Connecticut
Non-profit organizations based in Connecticut
Protected areas of Fairfield County, Connecticut